Scott Brian Stantis (born May 2, 1959) is an American editorial cartoonist.

Career
Stantis is currently the editorial cartoonist for The Chicago Tribune.  He began his career with The Chicago Tribune on September 1, 2009, following the paper's nine-year search to replace Jeff MacNelly, who died in June 2000. Stantis was previously a staff cartoonist for The Birmingham News, The Orange County Register, The Commercial Appeal, The Arizona Republic, and the Grand Rapids Press, and did weekly cartoons for USA Today.

His editorial cartoons are syndicated to over 400 newspapers via Tribune Content Agency. He usually espouses a conservative or libertarian stance in his cartoons, calling himself a "contrarian".

He was president of the Association of American Editorial Cartoonists 2003–2004.

He has also created several comic strips:
 Sydney (1985–1986; through United Media)
 The Buckets (1990–present; originally through Tribune Media Services, later through United Media)
 Prickly City (2004–present; through Universal Press Syndicate).

Stantis has also assisted Bob Thaves on his comic-strip King Baloo.

In 2001 Stantis hosted a short-lived afternoon talk show on one of Birmingham's local talk stations, WYDE 850 AM, after guest-hosting some of the station's other shows.

Personal life
Stantis attended Los Angeles Harbor College in Wilmington, California, and studied under intellectual William Loiterman at Los Angeles Harbor College before attending California State University, Long Beach. He and his wife of over 30 years, Janien Fadich-Stantis, have two sons.

References

External links
 Scott Stantis' blog
 Prickly City
 

1959 births
Living people
American comics artists
American editorial cartoonists
American libertarians
Presidents of the Association of American Editorial Cartoonists